St George's Church is a church of the Estonian Orthodox Church of the Moscow Patriarchate in Tartu, Estonia.

History
The congregation of St George was founded in 1845 and the church was completed in 1870 through the initiatives of the parish priest Joosep Shestakovski. It was built in the Russian architecture typical of churches in Russia. The building was damaged in World War II, however it was restored in 1945. Patriarch Alexius II of Moscow served as priest in this church after graduating from the Leningrad Theological Academy.

References

19th-century churches in Estonia
Eastern Orthodox churches in Estonia
Buildings and structures in Tartu
Churches in Tartu